Rectus muscle (Latin: , "straight muscle") may refer to:

In the trunk:
 Rectus abdominis muscle

In the eye:
 Inferior rectus muscle
 Lateral rectus muscle
 Medial rectus muscle
 Superior rectus muscle

In the leg:
 Rectus femoris muscle

In the neck:
 Rectus capitis anterior muscle
 Rectus capitis lateralis muscle